The Lee Rong-chun Literary Museum is a museum in Toucheng Township, Yilan County, Taiwan.

History
The museum building used to be the principal's dormitory of Toucheng Elementary School. The building was then declared a historical building by Yilan County Government. Originally it was converted into the Toucheng Township History Hall by the Cultural Affairs Bureau of the county government. It was then converted into Lee Rong-chun Literary Museum in 2009.

Architecture
The museum building is a Japanese architecture-style building.

See also
 List of museums in Taiwan

References

External links

 

2009 establishments in Taiwan
Biographical museums in Taiwan
Literary museums in Taiwan
Museums in Yilan County, Taiwan
Museums established in 2009